Mikhalevo is a rural locality (a village) in Podlesnoye Rural Settlement, Vologodsky District, Vologda Oblast, Russia. The population was 6 as of 2002.

Geography 
Mikhalevo is located 18 km southeast of Vologda (the district's administrative centre) by road. Nadeyevo is the nearest rural locality.

References 

Rural localities in Vologodsky District